The 1931 NCAA Wrestling Championships were the 4th NCAA Wrestling Championships to be held. Brown University in Providence, Rhode Island hosted the tournament at Brown Gymnasium.

Oklahoma A&M took home the team championship with 29 points with four individual champions.

Team results

Individual finals

References

NCAA Division I Wrestling Championship
Wrestling competitions in the United States
1931 in sports in Rhode Island
March 1931 sports events